Federico Herrera (born 1845) was a Peruvian politician. He was born in Ayacucho, Peru. He was a member of the Constitutional Party (Peru). He served as minister of the interior in the Government of Peru. He was a member of the Chamber of Deputies of Peru. He served twice as Prime Minister of Peru (in August 1891 and from October 1891 to April 1892).

Bibliography
 Basadre Grohmann, Jorge: Historia de la República del Perú (1822 - 1933), Tomo 10. Editada por la Empresa Editora El Comercio S. A. Lima, 2005.  (V. 10).

1845 births
Year of death unknown
Prime Ministers of Peru
People from Ayacucho
Constitutional Party (Peru) politicians
Peruvian Ministers of Interior
Members of the Chamber of Deputies of Peru
Freemasons